Yash Johar (6 September 1929 – 26 June 2004) was an Indian film producer and the founder of Dharma Productions. His films featured lavish sets, were often set in "exotic" locations, and incorporated Indian traditions and family values. He is the father of Karan Johar, now a noted filmmaker himself.

Personal life 
Johar was born on 6 September 1929 in Amritsar, Punjab, in a Punjabi Hindu family. He was married to Hiroo, sister of filmmakers B. R. Chopra and Yash Chopra. He died on 26 June 2004 in Mumbai, aged 74, of a chest infection, though he had also been fighting cancer. After his death, his son took over Dharma Productions.

Career 
Johar began his career as a publicist and still photographer in the early 1950s, working on the film Badal (1951). He worked for Sashadhar Mukherjee's production company Filmistan  as a production executive on the film Love in Simla (1960). In 1962, he joined Sunil Dutt's production house Ajanta Arts. He was a production controller for films like Mujhe Jeene Do and Yeh Raaste Hai Pyaar Ke. He helped filmmaker Dev Anand handle the production of his 1965 film Guide, which was successful at the box office. He continued with Dev Anand's Navketan Films and handled production of films like Jewel Thief, Prem Pujari and Hare Rama Hare Krishna.

In 1976, Johar launched his own banner, Dharma Productions. The first film produced by the company, Dostana, directed by Raj Khosla, was a box office success in 1980. The company produced a handful of other films in the 1980s and early 1990s, most notably Duniya (1984), Agneepath (1990), Gumrah (1993) and Duplicate (1998). 

He was also an associate producer on the 1994 Hollywood film The Jungle Book.

The company found unprecedented success with the 1998 award-winning film Kuch Kuch Hota Hai, the directorial debut of his son Karan Johar. The film starring Shah Rukh Khan, Kajol, Rani Mukerji and Salman Khan was one of the biggest hits of the year both domestically and in the overseas market. The film was critically acclaimed as well, winning major awards at Indian award ceremonies. Karan's second directorial, Kabhi Khushi Kabhie Gham... in 2001 was also immensely successful.

Johar was also involved in the production and distribution company Dreamz Unlimited founded in 1999 by Shah Rukh Khan, Juhi Chawla and Aziz Mirza. He helped set up the company as well as handling the production process of their first film, Phir Bhi Dil Hai Hindustani (2000).

Kal Ho Naa Ho, was the last film he was involved in, which was a major critical and commercial success, becoming the top-grossing film domestically and in the overseas market that year.

Selected filmography

Producer 
 Dostana (1980)
 Duniya (1984)
 Muqaddar Ka Faisla (1987)
 Agneepath (1990)
 Gumrah (1993)
 Duplicate (1998)
 Kuch Kuch Hota Hai (1998)
 Kabhi Khushi Kabhie Gham... (2001)
 Kal Ho Naa Ho (2003)

See also 
 Cinema of India
 Lists of Indians by state

References

External links 
 
 Dharma Productions, Yash Johar's production company

1929 births
2004 deaths
Businesspeople from Amritsar
20th-century Indian businesspeople
Hindi film producers
Film producers from Mumbai
Producers who won the Best Popular Film Providing Wholesome Entertainment National Film Award
Punjabi people